Admiral Sir Edward Francis Benedict Charlton  (21 March 1865 – 23 October 1937) was a Royal Navy officer who went on to be Commander-in-Chief, Cape of Good Hope Station.

Naval career
Charlton joined the Royal Navy in 1878 and served in the Anglo-Egyptian War in 1882. Promoted to the rank of captain on 1 January 1903, he was made Captain (Destroyers) in the Home Fleet in 1904. He went on to be assistant director of torpedoes from 1911. He served in World War I as Admiral Commanding East Coast Minesweepers from 1914 and then as Commander-in-Chief, Cape of Good Hope Station from 1916. After the War he became Flag Officer commanding the East Coast of England. He retired in 1924.

He lived at Eastern House in Alverstoke in Hampshire.

Family
In 1903 he married Laura Mary Strutt; they had three daughters. In 1910 he married Winifred Mary Stapleton-Bretherton; they had two sons and three daughters.

References

External links
The Dreadnought Project - Edward Charlton (Royal Navy officer)

1865 births
1937 deaths
Royal Navy admirals of World War I
Knights Commander of the Order of the Bath
Knights Commander of the Order of St Michael and St George